The 1996–1997 Highland Football League was won by Huntly for the fourth year in a row. Fort William finished bottom.

Table

Highland Football League seasons
4